Camp Klamath is an unincorporated community in Del Norte County, California. It is located on the east bank of the Klamath River  from its mouth, at an elevation of 23 feet (7 m).

References

External links

Unincorporated communities in Del Norte County, California
Klamath River
Populated coastal places in California
Unincorporated communities in California